Stuart Springs is a city park in Forrest City, Arkansas.  The  park is located on the northeast side of the city, at the end of East Arlington Avenue.  The park's main features are three springs, which were developed as a spa around the turn of the 20th century.  At Stuart Spring, the largest of the three, there still stand foundational remnants of the brick springhouse.  There are no traces left of an adjacent pavilion which was also built.  The park now provides passive recreational opportunities, with walkways and playgrounds.

The park was listed on the National Register of Historic Places in 1977.

See also
National Register of Historic Places listings in St. Francis County, Arkansas

References

Buildings and structures completed in 1900
Parks on the National Register of Historic Places in Arkansas
National Register of Historic Places in St. Francis County, Arkansas
Forrest City, Arkansas
Protected areas of St. Francis County, Arkansas
1900 establishments in Arkansas